Croatian News Agency (HINA) is the government-owned national news agency of Croatia. It was established on 26 July 1990. The agency is based at Marko Marulić Square in the Lower Town neighbourhood in central Zagreb.

The total amount of budget funds allocated to HINA in 2014 was 16.7 million HRK (c. 2.2 million EUR).

See also
Media of Croatia

References

External links 
 
O ulozi i važnosti Hine u hrvatskom medijskom prostoru 

News agencies based in Croatia
Mass media companies established in 1990
Companies based in Zagreb
Mass media in Zagreb
Government-owned companies of Croatia
1990 establishments in Croatia